Juozas Aleksandras Jagelavičius (12 January 1939 – 17 June 2000) was a Lithuanian rower. He competed for the Soviet Union at the 1964 and 1968 Summer Olympics in the coxed eight and finished in fifth and third place, respectively. Between 1963 and 1969 he won two gold and five silver medals at European and world championships. In 1965 Jagelavičius graduated from the Vilnius Pedagogical Institute and starting from 1972 worked as a rowing coach. His wife Genovaitė Strigaitė was also an international rower.

References

External links
 
 

1939 births
2000 deaths
People from Telšiai District Municipality
Lithuanian male rowers
Medalists at the 1968 Summer Olympics
Olympic bronze medalists for the Soviet Union
Olympic medalists in rowing
Olympic rowers of the Soviet Union
Rowers at the 1964 Summer Olympics
Rowers at the 1968 Summer Olympics
Soviet male rowers
World Rowing Championships medalists for the Soviet Union
Honoured Masters of Sport of the USSR
European Rowing Championships medalists
Lithuanian University of Educational Sciences alumni